Joseph Wheeler (1836–1906) was a Confederate States Army general.

Joseph or Joe Wheeler may also refer to:
 Joseph Wheeler (pirate) (fl. 1696–1698), pirate active in the Indian Ocean and Red Sea
 Joseph Wheeler (musicologist) (1927–1977), British musician and musicologist
 Joseph Wheeler (shipbuilder), 19th-century Irish shipbuilder
 Joseph Wheeler (sculpture), a bronze sculpture by Berthold Nebel
 Joseph Mazzini Wheeler (1850–1898), English atheist and freethought writer
 Joseph L. Wheeler (1884–1970), American librarian
 Joe Wheeler (baseball) (1898–?), American baseball player
 Joe Wheeler (rugby union) (born 1987), New Zealand rugby union player
 Katsuya Jonouchi, aka Joey Wheeler

See also
 Joseph Wheeler High School, Georgia, U.S.
 Joe Wheeler State Park, Alabama